Yoan Tisseyre (born 8 May 1989), is a French professional rugby league footballer who currently plays for XIII Limouxin in the Elite One Championship. and has represented France, as a . He previously played for FC Lezignan and Toulouse Olympique Championship.

Playing career

Limoux Grizzlies
On 30 Jun 2020 it was reported that he had signed for Limoux Grizzlies in the Elite One Championship

International
He made his sole international appearances from the bench in the 11-12 loss to Wales on 23 Oct 2010

References

1989 births
Living people
France national rugby league team players
French rugby league players
Lézignan Sangliers players
Limoux Grizzlies players
Rugby league second-rows
Toulouse Olympique players